The Old Barn is a historic barn off Blue Hill River Road in Canton, Massachusetts.

Based on the construction methods used, it is estimated to have been built between 1690 and 1720, and is the oldest building on Brookwood Farm. It is currently undergoing a major restoration undertaken by the North Bennet Street School.  They have removed the oldest  section for major work to repair rot and insect damage. It is expected to be returned to the site in 2010 or 2011. All of the photographs here are of the portions of the barn built after the original barn.

The barn was added to the National Register of Historic Places as Old Barn on September 25, 1980.

Gallery

See also
National Register of Historic Places listings in Norfolk County, Massachusetts

References

Barns on the National Register of Historic Places in Massachusetts
Buildings and structures completed in 1690
Buildings and structures in Canton, Massachusetts
Barns in Massachusetts
National Register of Historic Places in Norfolk County, Massachusetts
1690 establishments in Massachusetts